Ida Marie Bille (1822-1902) was a Danish courtier; Overhofmesterinde (Mistress of the Robes) to the queen of Denmark, Louise of Hesse-Kassel, from 1864 to 1876.

Born to count Preben Bille-Brahe and Johanne Caroline Wilhelmine Falbe and sister of Johan Christian Bille-Brahe, she married diplomat Christian Høyer Bille in 1844. She was appointed chief lady in waiting to the queen in 1864. She retired in 1876 and was granted a pension at Vallø Stift.

References
 Dansk Adelskalender 1878
 Dansk Biografisk Leksikon, der udkom 1933–44.

1822 births
1902 deaths
19th-century Danish people
Danish ladies-in-waiting
Mistresses of the Robes (Denmark)
Bille family